The Republic of Independent Guiana, commonly referred to by the name of the capital Counani (rendered "Cunani" in Portuguese), was a short-lived unrecognized state in South America.

Republic (1886–1891)
The borders between France and the Empire of Brazil were not clear. Attempts at negotiations failed, and in 1862 it was decided that the area between the Amazon and the Oyapock rivers was a neutral territory. Paul Quartier, who had previously visited the territory in 1883, returned in 1885 and had a meeting with the village chiefs of Counani and Carsewenne (nowadays: Calçoene) who were hostile to the Brazilians. Quartier signed a treaty on 23 July 1886 creating the country of Counani in the disputed area.

A government was set up in Counani led by Jules Gros as President, Guigues as Minister of State and Quartier as Quartermaster. They set about recruiting settlers, and according to Le Gaulois received over 3,000 requests. Both France and Brazil did not like what was happening and released a joint statement on 11 September 1887 stating that the Republic of Counani is not recognized. Gros was later deposed by his officials, and the death of Gros in 1891 resulted in the end of the short lived first Republic.

In 1894 gold was discovered in the Calçoene River, which resulted in a declaration of another autonomous state under Brazilian protection by general Francisco Cabral. In May 1895, Cabral arrested the village chief of Calçoene who had changed sides to the French. Camille Charvein, the Governor of French Guiana, sent troops to Mapá (nowadays: Amapá), and forced Cabral to retreat. Six French, and 30 Brazilian soldiers and civilians were killed during the battle, with an additional 60 French casualties. In 1897, France and Brazil asked Switzerland to settle the dispute, and most of the territory of the former state of Counani was given to Brazil in what is nowadays the state of Amapá.

Free State of Counani (1901–1904)

In 1901 a Frenchman named Adolphe Brezet proclaimed himself "Président de l'État libre de Counani". According to newspaper articles based on Brezet's statements, he was elected democratically in 1901.

This "special" State had a constitution, a flag and issued some stamps. It was never recognized by Brazil or France, but the South African Boer Republics opened diplomatic relations with Brezet (who had fought for them previously) during the Boer Wars. In 1904, Japan and Russia asked for vessels which Brezet didn't have, and thus exposed himself to France and Brazil. Nevertheless he claimed to be a president until 1911 when he was exiled to London. In 1913, he claimed support of the British navy in a plan to recapture Counani.

Claimants of Head of State
 Jules Gros (1809–1891) – a French journalist who laid claim as head of state from 1887 to 1891; he was Secretary of the Société de géographie in 1883
  - a Brazilian general (1894-1895) 
 Adolphe Brezet - a French military officer (1901–1904)

References

Citations

Sources 

  "Annales d'hygiène et de médecine coloniale, Tome quatrième" (1901), about the sanitary situation in Counani, pp. 121 to 128 : p. 121, p. 122, p. 123, p. 124, p. 125, p. 126, p. 127, p. 128.
  

First Brazilian Republic
Former countries in South America
Former unrecognized countries
Former republics
French colonization of the Americas
Republic of Independent Guyana
Republic of Independent Guyana
States and territories established in 1886
States and territories disestablished in 1891
Amapá